Seán 'Socky' O'Connor (born 21 October 1983) is an Irish former professional footballer who played for St. Patrick's Athletic over two spells, Limerick & Shamrock Rovers over two spells. He is currently coach of League of Ireland Premier Division club St Patrick's Athletic and manager of St Patrick's Athletic U19.

Club career
As a 17-year-old with Crumlin United, he was good enough to earn a trial with Preston North End, but any hopes he had of making a career across the water were dashed when he suffered a cruciate ligament injury on his return to Dublin.

St Patrick's Athletic
O'Connor is a midfielder and he joined St. Pats from non-league side Crumlin United. He played for Ireland in the UEFA Regions' Cup in Poland in July 2005 and won 12 amateur caps in all. On his return from Poland John McDonnell (footballer) invited him to train with St Pats and he was signed shortly after. He made his League of Ireland debut on 22 July 2005 against Waterford United. He scored his first goal for Pats in the last game of the 2005 season. O'Connor also scored for Pats in their FAI Cup Final loss in 2006.
He made 2 appearances for the Saints in the UEFA Cup during the 2007 season.

Shamrock Rovers
Seán signed for the Hoops in November 2007. He made his competitive debut on 8 March 2008 and scored his first goal on 27 May.

Limerick
O'Connor signed for his ex manager Pat Scully at Limerick in March 2011. And made his debut as a substitute in a 1–0 defeat away to Cork City on 19 March 2011. He wore the number 45 shirt.
In July 2011 he cancelled his contract with Limerick.

Return to Inchicore
2011 season

O'Connor was signed by Pete Mahon for St. Patrick's Athletic midway through the 2011 season. He was given the number 14 shirt. He scored on his first game back at the club against UCD on 7 August 2011 at Richmond Park. O'Connor went on an excellent run of goal involvement in September, scoring two goals against Galway United in a 6–1 win on 3 September, two more in the Leinster Senior Cup against Killester United on the 6th including a 35-yard wonder goal, two assists versus Bray Wanderers on the 9th and two superb goals away to Dundalk, one from 25 yards into the top corner and another from 40 yards. O'Connor rounded off a brilliant season that he scored 9 goals in 11 appearances in all competitions, with a delicate half-volley from 25 yards to lob Ger Doherty in the Derry City goal in a 1–1 draw and a top corner free kick from 25 yards away to Drogheda United.

2012 season

O'Connor signed a new contract to keep his at Pats' for the 2012 season to the delight of saints fans. He changed his squad number to the traditional left midfielders number 11. O'Connor started the 2012 season well, providing an assist for Greg Bolger's goal vs Glebe North, scoring the goal in a 1–0 win over Mervue United in friendly games and setting up Dean Kelly and John Russell's goals vs Bray Wanderers and Dundalk respectively in the first two games of the season. O'Connor opened the scoring in the league cup against UCD and later captained his side for the first time when Ger O'Brien was taken off after 66 minutes. O'Connor came on off the bench away to Sligo Rovers and headed in the equaliser after 72 minutes in a 1–1 draw live on RTÉ. A week later RTÉ viewers once again witnessed an O'Connor goal, this time away to Derry City, after his swerving shot from 25 yards was spilled into the goal by Derry keeper Ger Doherty. O'Connor had a great impact off the bench in the Dublin derby against Bohemians when he put in a world class cross for Christy Fagan to head home in the 4th minute of injury time in a 2–1 win at Richmond Park. Just four days later and he was action in another Dublin derby, this time at home to his old club Shamrock Rovers in the EA Sports Cup Quarter-final. O'Connor scored a header in the 27th minute to make it 1–1 after a good cross from Pat Flynn. The game went to extra time and penalties and O'Connor took Pats' first and scored on Reyaad Pieterse in the Rovers goal. He made his 100th appearance for the club when he came off the bench in a 1–1 draw away to Shamrock Rovers.

O'Connor scored in the FAI Cup final at Lansdowne Road at the same end against the same opposition in the 2012 version as Pats lost out once again.

Return to Rovers
O'Connor signed back for Rovers in a two-year deal in November 2012.

Managerial career

Honours

Club
St Patrick's Athletic
Leinster Senior Cup (1): 2011

Shamrock Rovers
League of Ireland (1): 2010
Setanta Sports Cup (1): 2013

Individual
PFAI Premier Division Team of the Year (1): 2012

References

External links
Irish Times profile

Republic of Ireland association footballers
Association football midfielders
Crumlin United F.C. players
St Patrick's Athletic F.C. players
Shamrock Rovers F.C. players
Limerick F.C. players
League of Ireland players
Living people
1983 births
A Championship players